Dodia tarandus is a moth of the family Erebidae. It is found in boreal black spruce bogs and adjacent open pine uplands from central Alberta eastward to Manitoba.

Larval biology and host plants are not known, but host plants are likely to be one or more species of the plant groups common in peatland habitats such as Salix and various Ericaceae.

External links
 A new species of Dodia Dyar (Noctuidae, Arctiinae) from central Canada

Callimorphina
Moths of North America
Moths described in 2009